Lluis Torner i Sabata (born in 1961) is a physicist. He founded and leads ICFO. in Barcelona, Catalonia (Spain). He is the recipient of the 2016 National Research prize of Catalonia and of the 2017 Nature mentorship award.

Career 
Lluis Torner obtained a PhD at the Polytechnic University of Catalonia (UPC) in 1989 after completing a degree in physics at the Autonomous University of Barcelona. He enjoyed post-doctoral appointments at CREOL, University of Arizona College of Optical Sciences. He has been Full Professor of the UPC since 2000. He works in nonlinear optics and its applications, with emphasis on optical solitons.

Torner is a Fellow of the European Physical Society, the European Optical Society and the Optical Society of America.  He served as the elected President of the Association of Research Institutions of Catalonia (ACER) during the period 2009–2014.

Torner conceived, founded, implemented and is leading ICFO. The institute was launched in 2002 in Barcelona with the mission to become a leading research center in Optics and Photonics. Today it hosts 400 people and is widely considered to be one of the top global research centres in its field.

Awards
Torner is the recipient of the Leadership Award of the Optical Society of America of the year 2011 and has been awarded a number of prizes, including the Monturiol Medal in 2010, the National Research Prize of Catalonia in 2016 and the Nature mentorship award in 2017.

References

External links 
ICFO Website

Spanish physicists
Polytechnic University of Catalonia alumni
1961 births
Living people
Autonomous University of Barcelona alumni